Animal is the second studio album by British musical duo Lump, composed of singer Laura Marling and producer Mike Lindsay. It was released on 30 June 2021 by Chrysalis and Partisan.

Background and recording 
Lump was formed in June 2016 after singer-songwriter Laura Marling and Mike Lindsay of folktronica group Tunng met at a Neil Young concert. Both were mutual fans of each other's work and they promptly began making music together, culminating in a self-titled debut which was released in 2018 to strong critical reception. The duo "had no idea" if they would make a second Lump album, but were pleased by the project's potential for further exploration and expansion, as well as its independence from the music they were best known for. Recording began in spring 2019, with Marling coming to Lindsay's home studio in Margate, Kent every two weeks between May and November of that year. Like their debut, Lindsay served as lead composer and musical director, while Marling provided vocal melodies and lyrics.

Composition 
According to Ben Cohn of Beats Per Minute, the album is a "robust synthesis" of both acoustic and digital musical genres, notably baroque pop, alternative dance and indie folk. Nonetheless, Lindsay tried not to use the acoustic elements "obviously related" to his work with Tunng and Marling's solo work. The New Statesmans Ellen Peirson-Hagger considered its music to be art pop with tendencies towards electropop, while Kevin Harley of Record Collector and Alex Rigotti of Gigwise described it as retro-electro and folktronica respectively. Lindsay aimed to capture a "vintage and late '70s flavour" for the sound of the record, but avoided replicating the sound of individual influences, instead "subliminally trying to channel those things".

Critical reception 

At Metacritic, which assigns a normalized rating out of 100 to reviews from mainstream critics, the album has an average score of 82, based on 8 critical reviews, indicating "universal acclaim".

Track listing 
All track are written by Laura Marling and Mike Lindsay and produced by Mike Lindsay.

Charts

References 

2021 albums
Chrysalis Records albums
Partisan Records albums
Art pop albums
Folktronica albums
Baroque pop albums
Alternative dance albums
Indie folk albums by British artists